Tomasz Wiktorowski (born 10 January 1981) is a Polish tennis coach and commentator who has coached Women's Tennis Association (WTA) No. 1 Iga Świątek since 2021. He coached former world No. 2 Agnieszka Radwańska from 2011 to 2018.

Career

Wiktorowski was born in 1981 in Warsaw. As a junior tennis player, he trained at a local tennis club in Warsaw and played briefly on the ITF Junior Circuit in 1998 and 1999. He graduated from the automotive department of the Warsaw University of Technology in 2005.

Wiktorowski has become known as one of Poland's foremost tennis minds. He began serving as captain of the Polish Fed Cup team in 2009 and coached Poland's Olympic tennis contingent in 2012 and 2016. He has also worked as a tennis commentator for Eurosport Polska and TVP Sport.

In mid-2011, Wiktorowski joined the team of longtime Polish No. 1 Agnieszka Radwańska, eventually replacing her father Robert as her primary coach. Radwańska had the best major results of her career with Wiktorowski, reaching the final of the 2012 Wimbledon Championships and making four other major semifinals. Despite never winning a major title, Radwańska got to a career-high WTA ranking of No. 2 and remained in the top 15 into 2017. Wiktorowski has said, referring to her crafty style of play, "There will never be a 'new Radwańska'".

Wiktorowski led Poland into the Fed Cup World Group in 2015, the country's highest showing in years, but they did not advance past the quarterfinals. Wiktorowski stepped down from the captain position later that year, having served in the role for seven years.

After Radwańska's retirement from tennis in 2018, Wiktorowski helped found the JW Tennis Support Foundation, which grants scholarships to young Polish players. In 2020, he began coaching Serbian top 200 player Olga Danilović, until the season was disrupted by the COVID-19 pandemic.

Wiktorowski joined Iga Świątek's team in the off-season before her very successful 2022 campaign, replacing longtime coach Piotr Sierzputowski and joining sports psychologist Daria Abramowicz and fitness trainer Maciej Ryszczuk. Wiktorowski and Świątek have both said that he helped her focus on playing more aggressively. Following the retirement in March of world No. 1 Ashleigh Barty, Świątek took over the No. 1 WTA ranking and went on a historic 37-match win streak. Overall she won 8 tournaments in 2022, including the French Open and US Open, and she ended the year with a 67–9 record and a huge ranking points total. Świątek was named the 2022 WTA Player of the Year, while Wiktorowski was a WTA Coach of the Year nominee. Przegląd Sportowy named Świątek Polish Sports Personality of the Year and Wiktorowski Polish Coach of the Year across all sports.

Personal life
Wiktorowski married his wife, Joanna, in 2016.

Awards
 Przegląd Sportowy Polish Coach of the Year (2022)

References

External links

JW Tennis Support Foundation (in Polish)

1981 births
Living people
Polish tennis coaches
Sportspeople from Warsaw